Patrick Henry O'Hagan (September 30, 1869 – January 14, 1913) was a Major League Baseball first baseman who played for two seasons. He played for the Washington Senators in 1892 and for the three following teams in 1902: the Chicago Cubs, the Cleveland Bronchos, and the New York Giants.

External links

1869 births
1913 deaths
Major League Baseball first basemen
Washington Senators (1891–1899) players
Chicago Cubs players
New York Giants (NL) players
Cleveland Bronchos players
Baseball players from Washington, D.C.
Minor league baseball managers
Norfolk Clam Eaters players
Roanoke Magicians players
Norfolk Clams players
Norfolk Crows players
New Haven Texas Steers players
Newark Colts players
Kansas City Blues (baseball) players
Rochester Bronchos players
Columbus Senators players
Newark Sailors players
Waterbury Authors players
Denver Grizzlies (baseball) players
Pueblo Indians players
Lynn Shoemakers players
19th-century baseball players